Curvibacter is a genus of comamonad bacteria.

References

Burkholderiaceae
Bacteria genera